Anna Maria Bacchiega (born 18 July 1957) is an Italian yacht racer who competed in the 1988 Summer Olympics.

References

1957 births
Living people
Italian female sailors (sport)
Olympic sailors of Italy
Sailors at the 1988 Summer Olympics – 470
Place of birth missing (living people)